Vancouver International Water Airport  is located adjacent to Vancouver International Airport in Richmond, British Columbia, Canada.

It is classified as an airport and as an airport of entry by Nav Canada and is staffed by the Canada Border Services Agency (CBSA). CBSA officers at this airport can handle general aviation aircraft only, with no more than 15 passengers.

The aerodrome has two docks, located at 4760 Inglis Drive, one operated by Harbour Air and the other by Seair Seaplanes. Floatplanes can be fairly easily transferred to Vancouver International Airport via a ramp and gate.

Airlines and destinations

See also
 List of airports in the Lower Mainland

References

Seaplane bases in British Columbia
Water Airport
Transport in Richmond, British Columbia
Certified airports in British Columbia